Devendra Satam is an Indian politician. He is a former Member of the Legislative Assembly elected from Karjat Vidhan Sabha constituency. He was elected as a member of the Shiv Sena party. He switched to the Bhartiya Janata Party.

References

Maharashtra MLAs 2004–2009
Bharatiya Janata Party politicians from Maharashtra
21st-century Indian politicians
Maharashtra politicians
Shiv Sena politicians
Year of birth missing (living people)
Living people